Charles George Hutter, Jr. (June 21, 1916 – September 24, 1989) was an American competition swimmer who represented the United States at the 1936 Summer Olympics in Berlin, Germany.  He competed for the second-place U.S. team in the first round of the men's 4×100-meter freestyle relay.  Hutter was not eligible to receive a medal, however, because only swimmers who competed in the relay event received medals under the swimming rules in effect for the 1936 Olympics.

See also
 List of Harvard University people

References

External links
 

1916 births
1989 deaths
American male freestyle swimmers
Harvard Crimson men's swimmers
Olympic swimmers of the United States
People from Pana, Illinois
Swimmers at the 1936 Summer Olympics